Slave to the Rhythm: The Artist Formerly Known as Prince (published as Purple Reign in the U.S.), is a biography of the musician Prince by British journalist Liz Jones The title chosen by Citadel for the US edition, Purple Reign, had already been employed by Jon Bream, a critic from Minneapolis who had observed and recorded Prince's early career in Prince: Inside the Purple Reign (1984).

References

Biographies (books)
1997 non-fiction books
Prince (musician)